Straumsfjorden or Straumfjorden is a lake that is located along the border of the municipalities of Bygland and Valle in Agder county, Norway. The lake has a dam on the south end which discharges into the Hjellevatn lake and eventually travels to the lake Topsæ and the Tovdalselva river drainage basin.

Artifacts dating back to the Iron Age have been found along the lake.

See also
List of lakes in Aust-Agder
List of lakes in Norway

References

Lakes of Agder
Bygland
Valle, Norway
Reservoirs in Norway